Eugen Sutermeister (1862–1931) was a Swiss graveur and writer. In 1911, he founded the Sonos Society for people with hearing losses. Since 1912 he was member of the French Academy.

References

External links

1862 births
1931 deaths
People from Küsnacht
Swiss writers in German